Taraji Kola (also Romanized as Tarājī Kolā; also known as Tarāj Kolā) is a village in Ganjafruz Rural District, in the Central District of Babol County, Mazandaran Province, Iran. At the 2006 census, its population was 270, in 60 families. The highest temperature recorded in 2018 was 94 °F (34 °C) and, the lowest was 46 °F(8 °C).

References 

Populated places in Babol County